The Daihatsu Costa is a concept car introduced at the 2005 Tokyo Motor Show. It is basically a city car designed to be taken to the beach.

The Costa weighs 1,654 pounds (750 kg) and has no doors, similar to a golf cart. It is powered by a 660 cc turbocharged 3-cylinder engine. Its light weight and comparatively powerful engine make it relatively fast for its size. 

There are no plans to bring the Costa into production.

References
Tokyo Motor Show 2005 Highlights (Costa featured)
Daihatsu Costa Concept - Automobile Magazine 
IGN: 2005 Tokyo Motor Show - Part 2 (with Costa)

Costa